Léon Hourlier (16 September 1885 – 16 October 1915) was a French cyclist. He was born in Reims, France. He won the French national cycling championships in 1909, 1911 and 1914. He also won the Grand Prix de Paris in 1914. Both Hourlier and his brother-in-law and fellow cyclist Léon Comès enlisted in the French military during World War I. They died together in a military air accident at Saint-Etienne-au-Temple in the Champagne district in France.

References

1885 births
1915 deaths
French male cyclists
French military personnel killed in World War I
Sportspeople from Reims
Cyclists from Grand Est